Balasubramanian known as Bala is a Tamil film director, screenwriter, and producer, working in Tamil cinema. Bala has been praised for "revolutionizing Tamil cinema" through his realistic, dark and disturbing depiction of the working class on celluloid screen. Shaji N. Karun, who headed the jury of the 56th National Film Awards, said, "Bala is unique in many ways. The way he changed Tamil cinema's character was commendable ... There were many who tried for a change. Among the new generation of filmmakers, Bala leads the pack in bringing a change in Tamil cinema's outlook and approach."

Film career 
Bala was introduced by lyricist Arivumathi to director Balu Mahendra. Initially he was working as a production assistant in Balu Mahendra movie. Later Bala turned to work with him as assistant director in his movies. Bala made his directorial debut with Sethu in 1999, that gave a break to Vikram, the film's lead actor, who was also struggling in the Tamil film industry for almost a decade without a hit and recognition. More than 60 distributors saw the film and hesitated to screen it because of its tragic ending. The film was released on a low profile without any advertisement but after the first days the film started running to packed houses just through 'word of mouth'. The film was said to have initiated a 'new wave' as it received critical acclaim and became a hit. Its success led to remakes in Kannada (Huchcha), Telugu (Seshu) and Hindi (Tere Naam) languages.

Controversy 
Bala was chosen as the director for Varmaa, the Tamil remake of Arjun Reddy, for which the rights were bought by E4 Entertainment. Principal photography was wrapped up in September 2018. On 7 February 2019, E4 Entertainment issued a press statement stating that they would go for a complete re-shoot as they were not satisfied with the final cut provided by Bala. They added that the film would be relaunched with a completely new cast and crew while retaining lead actor Dhruv. Bala disagreed with these comments, saying it was his own decision to quit the film "in order to safeguard creative freedom" because he was asked to make changes. This became the first such incident in Tamil cinema that the producer of the film refused to release the film due to unsatisfactory final cut despite the completion of the film.

Personal life 
Bala married Muthumalar in 2004 and has a daughter. Bala and Muthumalar divorced in 2022, after 18 years of marriage.

Filmography

References

External links 

 

Living people
20th-century Indian film directors
21st-century Indian film directors
Best Director National Film Award winners
Filmfare Awards South winners
Film directors from Tamil Nadu
Tamil film directors
Tamil-language film directors
Tamil Nadu State Film Awards winners
Tamil screenwriters
Screenwriters from Tamil Nadu
1966 births